Russ Lossing (born 1960) is an American jazz pianist, composer, improviser, arranger, educator, scholar.

Early life
Lossing was born in Ohio in 1960, and is from Columbus, Ohio. He had classical piano lessons from the age of 5 and began studying jazz aged 13 in Columbus at the Jazz and Contemporary Workshop with Dave Wheeler. He obtained a Bachelor of Music in piano at Ohio State University in 1986. Meetings with composer John Cage had a big effect: We only had two occasions to get together and talk, but any time spent with him was utterly valuable. He read through my scores we played piano together. His thing was creating, not emulating: don't copy; trust YOURSELF. I was already going in this direction but this experience, listening to Cage's concepts and philosophy in this setting, made so much sense.

Later life and career
Lossing has been part of the New York jazz scene since 1986. In 1988 he earned a Master of Music from the Manhattan School of Music. He has led or co-led numerous bands, including: his own trio with Masa Kamaguchi and Billy Mintz; Three-Part Invention with bassist Mark Helias and trumpeter Ralph Alessi; and duos with saxophonist Tim Berne, drummer Gerry Hemingway, and guitarist Ben Monder. Others are: trio with Paul Motian and Ed Schuller (Dreamer and As It Grows); trio with Mat Maneri and Mark Dresser (Metal Rat); trio with John Hebert and Jeff Williams (Phrase 6); quartet with Loren Stillman, John Hebert and Eric McPherson (Personal Tonal); King Vulture with Adam Kolker, Matt Pavolka and Dayeon Seok; and duos with saxophonist Loren Stillman, bassist John Hebert (Line Up,Hatology), and saxophonist Michael Adkins.

Lossing played with drummer Paul Motian over a period of 12 years and recorded Drum Music, a solo piano tribute album to him in 2011. The JazzTimes reviewer of Drum Music commented that "his two-fisted takes on 'Fiasco', 'Dance' and 'Drum Music' capture the great drummer's unpredictable and audacious rhythmic pulse. Lossing's stark re-imaginings of [... other Motian pieces] all vibrate with a new spirit of exploration."

Lossing has composed over 400 pieces of music. In 2015, he founded the record label Aqua Piazza.

Playing style
Scott Yanow, reviewing Lossing's As It Grows, commented that the pianist "is influenced by modern classical music to an extent but his playing is not unremittingly atonal. Instead, he leaves his impressionistic music open to all possibilities, mostly emphasizing dramatic ideas and unexpected silences."

Lossing said of his own style: "Much 20th century composition is about interval play, especially Bartok and Schoenberg's. The 12-tone thing helped him to get his ideas onto paper, but it was always about the intervals. I'm a jazz pianist but my harmonic approach is based on  this concept – finding new sounds and new expressions among the intervals."

Discography
An asterisk (*) indicates that the year is that of release.

As leader/co-leader

As sideman (partial list)

References

American jazz pianists
American male pianists
Living people
American jazz composers
American male jazz composers
Musicians from Columbus, Ohio
Ohio State University College of Arts and Sciences alumni
Jazz musicians from Ohio
21st-century American composers
21st-century American pianists
20th-century American composers
1960 births
20th-century American pianists
20th-century American male musicians
21st-century American male musicians
Clean Feed Records artists
Sunnyside Records artists
20th-century jazz composers
21st-century jazz composers